The Maestro, The Magistrate & The Mathematician is a novel written by Zimbabwean writer Tendai Huchu. Huchu's second novel, it was published in 2014 by Amabooks Publishers and republished by Parthian Books in 2015.

References 

2014 Zimbabwean novels
Novels by Tendai Huchu